Billiatt may refer to:
 Billiatt, South Australia, a locality in the Murray Mallee region
 Billiatt Conservation Park, protected area in South Australia
 Billiatt National Park, the former name of the Billiatt Conservation Park
 Billiatt Wilderness Protection Area, protected area in South Australia
 Hundred of Billiatt, one of the cadastral divisions of South Australia

See also
Billiat, a commune in France